David Hamid (born 18 June 1955) is an Anglican bishop with British and Canadian citizenship. He has been the Suffragan Bishop in Europe since 2002.

Early life
Hamid was born on 18 June 1955 in Scotland, to Scottish and Burmese parents. He holds dual British and Canadian citizenship. He was educated at Nelson High School in Burlington, Ontario, Canada. He studied at McMaster University, graduating with a Bachelor of Science (BSc) degree in 1978. He then matriculated into Trinity College, Toronto, and graduated from the Toronto School of Theology with a Master of Divinity (M.Div.) degree in 1981.

Ordained ministry
Hamid was ordained in the Anglican Church of Canada as a deacon in June 1981 and as a priest in 1982. After ordination he was curate at St Christopher's, Burlington, Ontario, and then rector of St John's in the same city. Following this he was mission co-ordinator for Latin America and the Caribbean for the Anglican Church of Canada and then (his last post before his ordination to the episcopate), the Director of Ecumenical Affairs and Studies of the Anglican Communion. On 17 October 2002, at Southwark Cathedral, he was one (with Richard Cheetham and David Hawkins) of the last three people to be ordained and consecrated a bishop by George Carey before his retirement as Archbishop of Canterbury.

Personal life
Hamid has been married since 1978 and they have two children.

Styles
The Reverend David Hamid (1981–1992)
The Reverend Canon David Hamid (1992–2002)
The Right Reverend David Hamid (2002–present)

References

External links

Eurobishop: David Hamid's blog

1955 births
Nelson High School (Ontario) alumni
McMaster University alumni
Anglican suffragan bishops in Europe
21st-century Church of England bishops
Living people
Trinity College (Canada) alumni
British people of Burmese descent
Canadian people of Burmese descent